Trio Jeepy is a jazz album featuring saxophonist Branford Marsalis leading a trio that included notable bassist Milt Hinton. It was recorded January 3–4, 1988 at Astoria Studios in New York, New York. It peaked at number 3 on the Top Jazz Albums chart. It was nominated for a Grammy Award in 1989 for Best Jazz Instrumental Performance, Group.

The AllMusic review by Scott Yanow states, "Branford Marsalis clearly had a lot of fun during this set... The performances are quite spontaneous (the occasional mistakes were purposely left in) and Marsalis really romps on such tunes as "Three Little Words," "Makin' Whoopee," and "Doxy." On the joyful outing that is also one of Branford Marsalis' most accessible recordings, Milt Hinton often steals the show."

Marsalis' cover of Makin' Whoopee would later be the first music video featured on VH1 Smooth upon its initial broadcast on August 1, 1998.

Track listing (compact disc)
 "Housed from Edward" (Branford Marsalis)
 "The Nearness of You" (Hoagy Carmichael, Ned Washington)
 "Three Little Words" (Bert Kalmar, Harry Ruby)
 "Makin' Whoopee" (Walter Donaldson, Gus Kahn)
 "U.M.M.G." (Billy Strayhorn)
 "Gutbucket Steepy" (Milt Hinton, Branford Marsalis, Jeff Watts)
 "Doxy" (Sonny Rollins)
 "Makin' Whoopee (Reprise)" (Donaldson/Kahn) 
 "Peace" (Ornette Coleman)
 "Random Abstract (Tain's Rampage)" (Branford Marsalis)

Note: The original LP and cassette releases included one additional track, a version of "Stardust" lasting 9:07 and featuring Milt Hinton and Jeff Watts.

Personnel
 Branford Marsalis - saxophones
 Jeff "Tain" Watts - drums
 Milt Hinton - bass (tracks 1-6, 8)
 Delbert Felix - bass (tracks 7, 9, 10)

References

External links
 BranfordMarsalis.com
 

1989 albums
Branford Marsalis albums
Albums produced by George Butler (record producer)